Pterostylis papuana is a plant in the orchid family Orchidaceae and is endemic to New Guinea and the Maluku and Solomon Islands.

References

papuana
Orchids of New Guinea
Orchids of Indonesia
Orchids of the Solomon Islands
Plants described in 1899
Taxa named by Robert Allen Rolfe